Gibson  is a surname of Scottish origin. It is an anglicised form the Scottish Gaelic Mac Gibealláin and can be a sept of Clan Campbell, Clan Buchanan or Clan MacMillan. Alternatively it is from a form of the common medieval name Gib, which is a short form of Gilbert. Variant forms of the surname include Gibsoun, Gipson, Gibbson, Gibbons, Gilson, Gibb, Gibbs and Gibby amongst others. 

The personal name Gilbert was introduced into Britain by followers of William the Conqueror after the Norman Invasion of 1066. The Norman name was originally found as Gislebert or Gillebert, and is composed of the Germanic elements Gisil, meaning "hostage" or "noble youth", and berht, meaning "bright" or "famous". Gilbert became a very popular given name in England and Scotland during the Middle Ages.

Notable people with the surname Gibson
Aaron Gibson (born 1977), American football player
Adam Gibson (born 1986), Australian basketball player
Adrian Gibson (born 1935), Australian politician
Alan Gibson (1923–1997), English sports journalist
Alan Gibson (director) (1938–1987), Canadian film director
Alan Gibson (bishop) (born 1856), clergyman in South Africa
Alec Gibson (born 1963), American football player
Aleena Gibson (born 1968), Swedish songwriter
Alex Gibson (disambiguation), multiple people
Alexander Gibson (disambiguation), multiple people
Alfred Gibson (died 1874), Australian explorer
Althea Gibson (1927–2003), African-American tennis player
Amy Gibson (born 1960), American actress and businesswoman
Andrea Gibson (born 1975), American poet
Andrew Gibson (disambiguation), multiple people
Anne Gibson, Baroness Gibson of Market Rasen (born 1940), British trade unionist
Antonio Gibson (born 1998), American football running back
Antonio Gibson (safety) (born 1962), American football safety
Ashley Gibson (born 1986), English rugby league player
Aubrey Gibson (1901–1973), Australian businessman and patron of the arts
Ben Gibson (disambiguation), multiple people
Bob Gibson (1935–2020), American baseball player
Bob Gibson (disambiguation), multiple other people
Brian Gibson (disambiguation), multiple people 
Bryan Gibson (born 1947), Canadian boxer
Carleton B. Gibson (1863–1927), first President of the Rochester Institute of Technology
Catherine Gibson (1931–2013), Scottish swimmer
Charles Gibson (born 1943), American broadcast journalist
Charles Gibson (disambiguation), multiple other people
Chris Gibson (disambiguation), multiple people
Clifford Gibson (1901–1963), American blues singer and guitarist
Colin Gibson (disambiguation), multiple people
Craig Gibson, American college baseball coach
Daniel Gibson (born 1986), American professional basketball player 
Darron Gibson (born 1987), Irish footballer
Darryl Gibson (disambiguation), multiple people
David Gibson (disambiguation), multiple people
Debbie Gibson (Deborah Gibson born 1970), American singer, Broadway performer
Dennis Gibson (disambiguation), multiple people
Diana Gibson (1915–1991), American actress
Donald Gibson (disambiguation), or Don Gibson, multiple people
Doug Gibson (disambiguation), multiple people
Edmund Gibson (1669–1748), English divine and jurist
Edward Gibson (disambiguation), multiple people
Eleanor J. Gibson (1910–2002), eminent American psychologist
Ella Elvira Gibson (1821–1901), first woman chaplain in the US military
Elspeth Gibson (born 1963), British fashion designer
Ernest Gibson (disambiguation), multiple people
Fred Gibson (disambiguation), multiple people
Gary Gibson (disambiguation), multiple people
George Gibson (disambiguation), multiple people
Ginny Gibson (1924–1998), vocalist and recording artist in New York in the 1950s
Gordon Gibson (born 1937), Canadian political columnist, author, and politician
Graeme Gibson (1934–2019), Canadian novelist
Greg Gibson (disambiguation), multiple people
Guy Gibson (1918–1944), Royal Air Force commander of the 'Dambusters' squadron
Henry Gibson (1935–2009), American actor
Herbert Gibson (disambiguation), multiple people
Hilda Gibson (1925–2013), member of the Women's Land Army during World War II
Henry Gibson (disambiguation), multiple people
Hoot Gibson (1892–1962), rodeo champion, pioneer cowboy film actor, film director, and producer
Hugh Gibson (disambiguation), multiple people
Hutton Gibson (1918–2020), father of actor Mel Gibson and a writer on religion
Ian Gibson (disambiguation), multiple people
John Gibson (1933–2019), American art dealer, gallerist of John Gibson Gallery in New York City
J. J. Gibson (1904–1979), American psychologist in the field of visual perception
Jack Gibson (disambiguation), multiple people
Jackie Gibson (disambiguation), multiple people
James Gibson (disambiguation), multiple people
Jean Gibson (1927–1991), English artist
Jill Gibson (born 1942), singer and artist who sang briefly in The Mamas & the Papas
John Gibson (disambiguation), multiple people
Jon Gibson (disambiguation), multiple people
Jonathan Gibson (disambiguation), multiple people
Josh Gibson (1911–1947), Baseball Hall of Fame member and player in the Negro leagues
Josh Gibson (footballer) (born 1984), Australian rules footballer
Julie Gibson (1913–2019), American singer and actress
Julie Ann Gibson, captain in the Royal Air Force
Keith Gibson, New Zealand footballer
Kelly Gibson (born 1964), American professional golfer
Kenny Gibson (born 1961), Scottish politician
Kenneth Gibson (disambiguation), multiple people
Kirk Gibson (born 1957), American baseball slugger
Kyle Gibson (disambiguation), multiple people
Lacy Gibson (1936–2011), American Chicago blues guitarist, singer and songwriter
Lawrence R. Gibson (1912–2004), American politician
Leah Gibson (born 1985), Canadian actress
Levi Withee Gibson (1872–1919), American politician
Lewis Gibson (figure skater) (born 1994), Scottish figure skater
Lorna Gibson, American materials scientist and engineer
Mabel Gibson (1901–1951), Australian singer in musicals
Marcus Gibson (born 1973), Australian author
Margaret Gibson (disambiguation), multiple people
Mark Thomas Gibson, (born 1980), American artist
Mel Gibson (born 1956), American-Australian film actor, director, and producer
Michael Gibson (disambiguation), or Mike Gibson, multiple people
Millie Gibson (born 2004), English actress
Miranda Gibson, Australian environmental activist and school teacher
Neil Gibson (disambiguation), multiple people
Orville Gibson (1856–1918), American luthier and founder of Gibson Guitar Corporation
Pandora Gibson, Bahamian comedian and storyteller
Pat Gibson (born 1961), Irish quiz player
Patrick Gibson (disambiguation), multiple people
Paul Gibson (disambiguation), multiple people
Rachel Gibson (disambiguation), multiple people
Ralph Gibson (born 1939), American awarded photographer
Sir Ralph Gibson (judge) (1922–2003), British judge
Randall L. Gibson (1832–1892), U.S. Congressman and Senator from Louisiana
Richard Gibson (disambiguation), multiple people
Robert Gibson (disambiguation), multiple people
Robin Gibson (disambiguation), multiple people
Sally Gibson, Canadian writer and historian
Sam Gibson (disambiguation), multiple people
Shane Gibson (disambiguation), multiple people
Sharon Gibson (born 1961), English javelin thrower
Shelton Gibson (born 1994), American football player
Steve Gibson (disambiguation), multiple people
Taj Gibson (born 1985), American basketball player
Thomas Gibson (disambiguation), multiple people
Todd Gibson (1936–2020), American racing driver
Tom Gibson (disambiguation), multiple people
Tony Gibson (disambiguation), multiple people
Tyrese Gibson (born 1978), American R&B and hip hop singer and songwriter
Ursula Gibson, American physicist
Violet Gibson (1876–1956), Irish would-be assassin of Benito Mussolini
Virginia Gibson (1925–2013), American dancer, singer and actress
Walter Gibson (disambiguation), multiple people
Wilfrid Wilson Gibson (1878–1962), British poet
William Gibson (disambiguation), multiple people

References

English-language surnames
Patronymic surnames
Surnames from given names